Pedomicrobium americanum is a bacterium from the genus of Pedomicrobium which has been isolated from freshwater in New York in the United States.

References

Further reading 
 
 

Hyphomicrobiales
Bacteria described in 1988